Pablo Márquez or Pablo Marquez may refer to:

 Pablo Márquez (guitarist), Argentinean guitarist
 Pablo Márquez (wrestler), Ecuadorian wrestler